Ryan Driller (born August 17, 1982) is an American pornographic actor who has appeared in both straight and gay pornography. In 2016, he received the XBIZ Award for Male Performer of the Year. Men's Health has described him as "one of the biggest names in the industry".

Early life 
Driller was born and raised in Littleton, Colorado. At 18, he moved to Key West, Florida, where he lived for seven years. Driller was a member of the Boy Scouts. Before entering the adult film industry, he worked as a radio promotions coordinator.

Career 
Driller entered the adult film industry after reaching out to agents about performing and receiving replies. He has performed in straight pornography under the name Ryan Driller and in gay pornography under the name Jeremy Bilding. He appeared in an episode of The Burn with Jeff Ross, in which Ross did a comedy skit during one of Driller's porn shoots.

Personal life 
Although he was raised Catholic, Driller stated he does not subscribe to any specific religious views. He voiced his support for Hillary Clinton in the 2016 United States presidential election.

Partial filmography

Awards and nominations

References

External links 

 
 
 
 

1982 births
American actors in gay pornographic films
American male pornographic film actors
Living people
People from Littleton, Colorado
People from Key West, Florida
Pornographic film actors from Colorado
Pornographic film actors from Florida
Bisexual male pornographic film actors
Former Roman Catholics